The 1932 United States Senate election in South Dakota took place on November 8, 1932. Incumbent Republican Senator Peter Norbeck ran for re-election to a third term. After easily turning back a challenge from former State Senator Harry F. Brownell in the Republican primary, Norbeck faced attorney Ulysses Simpson Grant Cherry, the Democratic nominee, in the general election. Owing in part to Franklin D. Roosevelt's landslide victory in South Dakota, the race was much closer than it was in 1926, but Norbeck still defeated Cherry by a decisive margin to win his third, and final, term. Norbeck died in office on December 20, 1936, triggering a special election in 1938.

Democratic Primary

Candidates
 Ulysses Simpson Grant Cherry, Sioux Falls attorney, 1920 Democratic nominee for the U.S. Senate
 Lewis W. Bicknell, Day County State's Attorney
 Mark Sheafe, Jr., former State Senator

Results

Republican Primary

Candidates
 Peter Norbeck, incumbent U.S. Senator
 Harry F. Brownell, former State Senator
 Charles Hartsough

Results

General election

Results

References

South Dakota
1932
1932 South Dakota elections